Poropuntius hampaloides is a species of ray-finned fish in the genus Poropuntius which is found in the Salween drainage of southern Myanmar.

References 

hampaloides
Fish described in 1890